Big Fugitive Life is an EP by Ezra Furman. It was released on 19 August 2016 by Bella Union records.

Track listing

References

2016 EPs
Ezra Furman albums